Olivier Picard (4 March 1940, Bernay) is a French Hellenist. He was director of the French School at Athens and is a member of the Institut de France.

Biography 
A student at the École normale supérieure (1960), Olivier Picard obtained his agrégation of history in 1964 and became a member of the French School at Athens (1966–1971). He immediately began his academic career at the Paris West University Nanterre La Défense (1971) where he was appointed a professor in 1979.

From 1981 until 1992, he was director of the French School at Athens.

Back in Nanterre, he quickly was elected at Paris IV-Sorbonne where he directed the graduate school of ancient and medieval history.

As an archaeologist, he led excavations on the sites of Thasos and Lato.

On 24 April 2009, he was elected a member of the Académie des Inscriptions et Belles-Lettres, in François Chamoux's seat.

Olivier Picard is the eldest son of Gilbert Charles-Picard and Colette Picard, both historians and archaeologists, and grandson of Hellenist Charles Picard.

Publications 
1971: Collection Hélène Stathatos. Bd. IV, 1: Bijoux et petits objets
1979: Chalcis et la confédération eubéenne. Étude de numismatique et d’histoire
1980: Les Grecs face à la menace perse
1980: with G. Reynaud: Catalogue de la donation Henry Vernin. Monnaies grecques
1992: with J.-F. Bommelaer, E. Pentazos: La redécouverte de Delphes
2000: Guerre et économie dans l’alliance athénienne (490-322 av. J.-C.)
2003: Royaumes et cités hellénistiques de 323 à 55 av. J.-C.
2005: L’exception égyptienne ? Production et échanges monétaires en Égypte hellénistique et romaine, actes du colloque d’Alexandrie, 13–15 April 2002, Frédérique Duyrat and Olivier Picard publishers, Études alexandrines 10, Cairo, reprinted in 2008, 391 p. 
2007: with J.-N. Barrandon: Monnaies de Bronze de Marseille, Analyse, classement, politique monétaire
2011: with Th. Faucher, M.-Chr. Marcellesi: 2011. Nomisma, La circulation monétaire dans le monde grec antique
2012: Les monnaies des fouilles du Centre d’Études alexandrines, Les monnayages de bronze à Alexandrie de la conquête d’Alexandre à l’Égypte moderne

External links 
 Olivier Picard on the site of the Académie des Inscriptions et Belles-Lettres
 Resume
 List of publications on Paris-Sorbonne.academia

Members of the Académie des Inscriptions et Belles-Lettres
École Normale Supérieure alumni
French archaeologists
Classical archaeologists
French numismatists
French hellenists
Officers of the Ordre national du Mérite
Commandeurs of the Ordre des Palmes Académiques
Members of the French School at Athens
People from Bernay, Eure
1940 births
Living people
French expatriates in Greece